A Woman's Heart is a 1926 American silent melodrama film directed by Phil Rosen and starring Enid Bennett, Gayne Whitman, and Edward Earle. It was released on September 15, 1926.

Cast
 Enid Bennett as Eve Waring
 Gayne Whitman as John Waring
 Edward Earle as Ralph Deane
 Mabel Julienne Scott as Vixen
 Lois Boyd as Patsy Allen
 Louis Payne as Lawyer

Preservation status
The film is now considered lost.

References

External links 
 
 
 

Melodrama films
American silent feature films
American black-and-white films
1926 drama films
1926 films
Silent American drama films
1920s English-language films
Films directed by Phil Rosen
1920s American films